Kaukaba, Kaukabet El-Arab or Kaukaba Station is a village in the  Hasbaya District in the Nabatiye Governorate in southern Lebanon.

Archaeology
By the village is a Neolithic archaeological site East of Majdel Balhis near Rashaya in the Beqaa Valley, Lebanon. It was first found by P. Billaux in 1957 who alerted Jesuit Archaeologists, Fathers Henri Fleisch and Tallon. Open air site excavations by L. and F. Skeels were also carried out in 1964.

The rock shelter site lies amongst fields covered with basalt boulders from ancient lava flows. It is in a low pass from the Karaoun Dam to Rashaya. This area is close to the 4 heads of the Jordan River and is drained by feeders such as the Dan, Banias, Hasbani and Upper Jordan rivers, North of Hasbaya.

Artefacts found on the surface included flint axes, sickles, obsidian, basalt vessels and arrowheads dated to the oldest Neolithic periods. Prominent artefacts found included a series of flint picks with heavily worn points due to extremely heavy usage. Fragments of agricultural tools such as basalt hoes have been found with very slight dating suggesting the 6th millennium or earlier. Flints were not knapped on site and the centre of the hoe production has not yet been found.

Modern era
In 1838, during the Ottoman era, Eli Smith noted the  population of Kaukaba as Maronite and Druze, while in 1875, Victor Guérin found the population to mostly be Maronite.

See also

Battle of Kaukaba
Emily Nasrallah

References

Bibliography

External links
  Kaoukaba, Localiban

Populated places in Hasbaya District
Maronite Christian communities in Lebanon

Neolithic settlements
Archaeological sites in Lebanon
Rock shelters